William Earl Johns (professionally known as W. E. Johns; 1893–1968) was an English writer and journalist. He wrote over 150 books and was, after Enid Blyton, "the most prolific and popular children's writer of his time". Most of Johns's work—102 books—consists of the stories of Biggles, a First World War pilot and, later, adventurer, detective and Second World War squadron leader. He also wrote science fiction stories, and two further series of war stories, featuring the characters Worrals of the Women's Auxiliary Air Force (WAAF) and Gimlet, a British Commando.

Johns served in the army during the First World War.  In 1917 he was commissioned into the Royal Flying Corps (RFC) and saw action in Northern France. In September 1918 his aircraft was shot down and Johns, wounded, was captured by the Germans; he remained a prisoner until the end of the war, despite two attempts to escape. He remained with the RFC through its change into the Royal Air Force (RAF), and served with them until 1927.

On leaving the RAF he became a journalist and illustrator. In 1932 he founded Popular Flying magazine and became its first editor. He used the magazine to publish his Biggles short stories. Johns described Biggles as "typical of the type of British airman I knew during the Great War. His chief characteristics are courage, loyalty and sportsmanship." He continued to publish his stories in periodicals and newspapers throughout his career. Six months after the first Biggles stories were published they were collected in book form in The Camels are Coming.  During the Second World War, Johns worked for the Air Ministry; the ministry asked him to create a female character to boost recruitment into the Women's Auxiliary Air Force, which resulted in the publication of the Worrals stories and books. The character was successful and the War Office requested Johns introduce a soldier, which led to the introduction of Gimlet.

Johns also wrote eight non-fiction books, most of which related to flying and pilots, although a book on gardening and two children's books—The Modern Boys Book of Pirates and The Biggles Book of Treasure Hunting—were also published. In 1942 Johns also co-wrote two radio plays, which were broadcast on the BBC.

As editor

Fiction

Publications in periodicals

Johns wrote a great number of short stories under his own name and the pseudonym William Earle; no complete list of these works exists. He was also a prolific contributor to articles, columns and news articles. He was the author of "The Passing Show" column for the My Garden magazine between 1937 and 1944 and a columnist for The Modern Boy, Pearson's Magazine, The Boy's Own Paper, The Girl's Own Paper and the ATC Gazette.

Non-fiction

Broadcast works
Several of Johns's works have been adapted for radio and television by others; the following is a list of works by Johns only.

Notes and references

Notes

References

Sources

External links
 

Information about the complete works of W. E. Johns    http://www.wejohns.com

Bibliographies by writer
Bibliographies of British writers
Mystery fiction bibliographies